This is a list of operational offshore wind farms in Japan.

List

List of projects

See also

Wind power in Japan
List of wind farms
List of offshore wind farms
Lists of offshore wind farms by country
Wind power

Notes

Japan